A single-elimination, knockout, or sudden death tournament is a type of elimination tournament where the loser of each match-up is immediately eliminated from the tournament. Each winner will play another in the next round, until the final match-up, whose winner becomes the tournament champion. Each match-up may be a single match or several, for example two-legged ties in European sports or best-of series in American pro sports. Defeated competitors may play no further part after losing, or may participate in "consolation" or "classification" matches against other losers to determine the lower final rankings; for example, a third place playoff between losing semi-finalists. In a shootout poker tournament, there are more than two players competing at each table, and sometimes more than one progressing to the next round. Some competitions are held with a pure single-elimination tournament system. Others have many phases, with the last being a single-elimination final stage, often called playoffs.

Nomenclature

In English, the round in which only eight competitors remain is generally called (with or without hyphenation) the quarter-final round; this is followed by the semi-final round, in which only four are left, the two winners of which then meet in the final or championship round.

The round before the quarterfinals has multiple designations. Often it is called the round of sixteen, last sixteen, or (in South Asia) pre-quarterfinals. In many other languages the term for these eight matches translates to eighth-final (e.g., in these eight European languages: "huitième de finale" in French, octavos de final in Spanish, Achtelfinale in German, ottavi di finale in Italian, oitavos-de-final in Portuguese, optimi de finală in Romanian osmifinále in Czech, osemfinále in Slovak, and osmina finala in Serbian), though this term is rare in English itself.

The round before the round of sixteen is sometimes called round of thirty-two in English. Terms for this in other languages generally translate as "sixteenth final".

Earlier rounds are typically numbered counting forwards from the first round, or by the number of remaining competitors. If some competitors get a bye, the round at which they enter may be named the first round, with the earlier matches called a preliminary round, qualifying round, opening round, or the play-in games.

Examples of the diverse names given to concurrent rounds in various select disciplines:

Notes:

Example
The final three rounds of the 2002–03 UEFA Champions League tournament:

Quarter-finals

Semi-finals

*Both clubs played their home leg in the same stadium (the San Siro), but Milan were the designated away side in the second leg, and thus won on away goals.

Final

Classification
Without any additional matches, the only position a single-elimination tournament can reliably determine is first - for example, if sorting the numbers 1-4 ascending, if 4 and 3 meet in the first round, 3 and 1 will lose in the first round and 2 will lose in the second, selecting 4 as the largest number in the set, but insufficient comparisons have been performed to determine which is greater, 2 or 3.  Despite this, the candidate that loses in the final round is commonly considered to have taken second place (in this case, 2).  When matches are held to determine places or prizes lower than first and second, these typically include a match between the losers of the semifinal matches called third place playoffs, the winner therein placing third and the loser fourth. Many Olympic single-elimination tournaments feature the bronze medal match if they do not award bronze medals to both losing semifinalists. The FIFA World Cup has long featured the third place match (since 1934), though the UEFA Euro has not held one since the 1980 edition.

Sometimes, contests are also held among the losers of the quarterfinal matches to determine fifth to eighth places – this is most commonly encountered in the Olympic Games, with the exception of boxing, where both fighters are deemed to be third place. In one scenario, two "consolation semifinal" matches may be conducted, with the winners of these then facing off to determine fifth and sixth places and the losers playing for seventh and eighth; those are used often in qualifying tournaments where only the top five teams advance to the next round; or some method of ranking the four quarterfinal losers might be employed, in which case only one round of additional matches would be held among them, the two highest-ranked therein then playing for fifth and sixth places and the two lowest for seventh and eighth.

The number of distinct ways of arranging a single-elimination tournament (as an abstract structure, prior to seeding the players into the tournament) is given by the Wedderburn–Etherington numbers. Thus, for instance, there are three different arrangements for five players:
 The players may be divided into brackets of two and three players, the winners of which meet in the final game
 The bottom four players may play a two-round tournament, the winner of which plays the top player
 The bottom two players may meet, after which each subsequent game pairs the winner of the previous game with the next player
However, the number of arrangements grows quickly for larger numbers of players and not all of them are commonly used.

Seeding

Opponents may be allocated randomly (such as in the FA Cup); however, since the "luck of the draw" may result in the highest-rated competitors being scheduled to face each other early in the competition, seeding is often used to prevent this. Brackets are set up so that the top two seeds could not possibly meet until the final round (should both advance that far), none of the top four can meet prior to the semifinals, and so on. If no seeding is used, the tournament is called a random knockout tournament.

Standard seeding pairs the highest and lowest, then second highest and second lowest and so on, for an 8 seed tournament this is 1 v 8, 2 v 7, 3 v 6 and 4 v 5, for example this is used for 16 seeds in the World Snooker Championship and 32 seeds in the World Darts Championship. Some tournaments stray from this, for example is not the procedure that is followed in most tennis tournaments, where the 1 and 2 seeds are placed in separate brackets, but then the 3 and 4 seeds are assigned to their brackets randomly, and so too are seeds 5 through 8, and so on. This may result in some brackets consisting of stronger players than other brackets, and since only the top 32 players of 128 are seeded in Tennis Grand Slam tournaments, it is conceivable that the 33rd-best player in a 128-player field could end up playing the top seed in the first round. An example of this occurring was when World No. 33 Florian Mayer was drawn against (and eventually defeated by) then-World No. 1 Novak Djokovic in the first round of the 2013 Wimbledon Championships, in what was also a rematch of a quarterfinal from the  previous year.

Sometimes the remaining competitors in a single-elimination tournament will be "re-seeded" so that the highest surviving seed is made to play the lowest surviving seed in the next round, the second-highest plays the second-lowest, etc. This may be done after each round, or only at selected intervals. In American team sports, for example, the NFL employs this tactic, but MLS, NHL and the NBA do not (and neither does the NCAA college basketball tournament). Although MLB does have enough teams (12) in its playoff tournament where re-seeding would have made a large difference in the matchups; only the WNBA's at the minimum, which is at least four from each conference for a total of 8. The NBA's format calls for the winner of the first-round series between the first and eighth seeds (within each of the two conferences the league has) to face the winner of the first-round series between the fourth and fifth seeds in the next round, even if one or more of the top three seeds had been upset in their first-round series; critics have claimed that this gives a team fighting for the fifth and sixth seeding positions near the end of the regular season an incentive to tank (deliberately lose) games, so as to finish sixth and thus avoid a possible match-up with the top seed until one round later. MLS' format is identical, except that the conference quarterfinals is a best-of-three series. 

In some situations, a seeding restriction may be implemented; from 1975 until 1989 in the NFL, and from 1994 until 2011 in MLB there was a rule where at the conference or league semifinal, should the top seed and last seed (wild card) be from the same division, they cannot play each other; in that case, the top seed plays the worst division champion; the second-best division champion plays the wild card team. This is due to the scheduling employed for the regular season, in which a team faces any given divisional opponent more often than any given non-divisional opponent – the tournament favors match-ups that took place fewer times in the regular season (or did not take place, in some cases). 

In international fencing competitions, it is common to have a group stage. Participants are divided in groups of 6–7 fencers who play a round-robin tournament, and a ranking is calculated from the consolidated group results. Single elimination is seeded from this ranking.

Evaluation
The single-elimination format enables a relatively large number of competitors to participate. There are no "dead" matches (perhaps excluding "classification" matches), and no matches where one competitor has more to play for than the other.

The format is less suited to games where draws are frequent. In chess, each fixture in a single-elimination tournament must be played over multiple matches, because draws are common, and because white has an advantage over black. In association football, games ending in a draw may be settled in extra time and eventually by a penalty shootout or by replaying the fixture.

Another perceived disadvantage is that most competitors are eliminated after relatively few games. Variations such as the double-elimination tournament allow competitors a single loss while remaining eligible for overall victory. However, losing one game requires the competitor to win more games in order to win the tournament.

In a random knockout tournament (single-elimination without any seeding), awarding the second place to the loser of the final is unjustified: any of the competitors knocked out by the tournament winner might have been the second strongest one, but they never got the chance to play against the losing finalist. In general, it is only fair to use a single-elimination tournament to determine first place. To fairly determine lower places requires some form of round-robin in which each player/team gets the opportunity to face every other player/team.

Also, if the competitors' performance is variable, that is, it depends on a small, varying factor in addition to the actual strength of the competitors, then not only will it become less likely that the strongest competitor actually wins the tournament, in addition the seeding done by the tournament organizers will play a major part in deciding the winner. As a random factor is always present in a real-world competition, this might easily cause accusations of unfairness.

Other tournament systems
Variations of the single-elimination tournament include:
 Double-elimination tournament
 McIntyre system, a group of tournament formats that combine features of single- and double-elimination tournaments. Varieties of this system include:
 Page playoff system (four teams)
 Top five play-offs
 Top six play-offs
 McIntyre final eight system
 Super League play-offs, which formerly used a McIntyre final eight variant
 AFL final eight system, another variant of the McIntyre final eight, currently used by the Australian Football League
Other common tournament types include:
 Round-robin tournament
 Swiss-system tournament

References

Tournament systems

ja:トーナメント方式#勝ち残り式トーナメント